The Ashgabat International School is an international school in Ashgabat, Turkmenistan. It is a private, non-profit day school which offers an educational program from a 3 to 4 year old program through high school for students of all nationalities. High school students may take courses by distance learning through Quality Schools International Distance Learning. School staff monitors all distance learning courses. The school was founded in 1994.

Facility 
Ashgabat International School is located on a five-hectare campus directly behind the American Embassy's new embassy compound under construction in the Berzengi district of Ashgabat. The school neighbors the National Museum and overlooks the city of Ashgabat. The school is a three-storey building with thirty classrooms, an elementary and secondary school library, two computer laboratories, teacher workroom, and office space. The building is earthquake safe, equipped with a fire alarm system, and includes a sophisticated water purification system. The fenced campus includes a grassed playing field, a running track, two tennis courts, a football field, and an indoor gymnasium. The school also has a cafeteria with a stage which is used for concerts, competitions, and other such events.

Curriculum
The curriculum is provided in English for Language Arts, Writing, Mathematics, Cultural Studies (history, geography, economics, and political science), Science, Art, Music, and Physical Education. Intensive English classes are provided to students who need additional help with English. Computer use is integrated across the curriculum using two computer labs (one for secondary and another one for elementary students). 
French, Spanish, as well as Russian as a foreign language are offered. Class sizes are big. A full four-year secondary program is offered. If selected secondary courses are not offered by school and are needed for graduation, these courses can be acquired through distance-learning programs from Quality Schools International with little additional cost to the parents. All distance-learning programs are closely monitored and proctored by North American and European certified Ashgabat International School teachers.

School information
Progress Reports

Students’ get “Status Reports” five times a year. Students progress or mastery of the curriculum is reported as either “A” or “B”. Individual narrative reports are sent home twice, once in the winter and once in the spring. Parent-teacher conferences are scheduled three times each school year.

Transportation

The school offers transportation to and from school for an additional fee.

Staffing

English speaking experienced teachers from western countries are employed. Some other nationalities are hired for instruction in other fields.

Student Placement

Following official admission procedures, a placement examination may be given to determine the appropriate level of instructions. The assessments may involve reading, writing and mathematics.

Governance

Quality Schools International, a non-profit private educational organization, manages the school. A Director administers Ashgabat International School on site. An appointed Advisory Board supports the school in the community. The School Director oversees all educational programs.

Special Program and Facilities
Library

•Access to more than 10,000 volumes and resource materials on CD-ROM

•A DVD and video server consisting of 3,000+ educational videos are part of the extended library services

Mobile Computer Laboratory

•A mobile computer lab consisting of netbook computers is available to all students

•Wireless network access is available

Language Programs

•Advanced Russian and French for native speakers and Russian and French as a second language are offered.

•The school also offers various languages

Extra-Curricular Activities

•Extra-curricular offerings vary throughout the year but often include sports, chess, gymnastics, cooking, fine arts, drama, etc.

Sources 
This article has been adapted from information released by the US State Department's Office of Overseas Schools on December 9, 2004, a public domain source.

External links

Quality Schools International
Private schools in Turkmenistan
Schools in Turkmenistan
Educational institutions established in 1994
1994 establishments in Turkmenistan
Education in Ashgabat